John Noble was an Elizabethan privateer who cruised the Caribbean coast of Veragua.

Career

Expedition

Veragua
In early June 1574, Noble, with 28 men aboard a ship of four heavy pieces and four falcons, landed at the Escudo de Veraguas Isle (12 Spanish nautical leagues from the port of Veragua). The Englishmen seem to have chosen this island for its location, as it lay in the route of all Spanish vessels bound to Veragua. Here, they cruised the coast aboard two launches, seizing many Spanish merchant frigates and barques off the Cativas headland and the Chagres River.

Capture
At some point in mid-June, Noble and company attempted to seize a Spanish merchant barque, but the latter managed to escape, whereupon they informed the governor of Veragua, Pedro Godinez Osorio, of the Englishmen's cruise. The governor immediately manned a rowing frigate with thirty harquebusiers out of Nombre de Dios. The frigate soon discovered Noble and company, firing four or five shots at them, whereupon the men crowded into a launch and made their escape. The governor gave chase right away, however, aboard a brig and a launch, eventually capturing two of the crew, drowning four, and forcing the rest to run aground near Chagres River. The marooned pirates were there apprehended by a former victim of theirs. All were convicted of piracy, and hanged (except two boys, who were served life sentences).

Aftermath

Legacy 
It has been suggested that Noble may have cruised the shores of colonial Honduras during in the first quarter of 1573, simultaneous to Francis Drake's or John Oxenham's cruise.

Notes

Citations

References 

 
 
 
 
 
 

1574 deaths
English privateers
16th-century English people